Château de l'Ortenbourg or Ortenberg is a ruined castle situated in the commune of Scherwiller in the département of Bas-Rhin of France. It is dated to the 13th century. It is a listed historical monument since 1924.

References

Houses completed in the 13th century
Ruined castles in Bas-Rhin